Samuel's Fortress is a fortress in the old town of Ohrid, North Macedonia. It was the capital of the First Bulgarian Empire during the rule of Tsar Samuel of Bulgaria at the turn of the 11th century. Today, this historical monument is a major tourist attraction and was heavily restored in 2003 with the addition of entirely new battlements where none had survived.

According to recent excavations by Macedonian archaeologists, it was contended that this fortress was built on the place of an earlier fortification, dated to the 4th century BC, which was probably built by King Philip II of Macedon. During the late 900s, King Samuil of Bulgaria restored the fortress by rebuilding it into a medieval style stronghold which still stands as is today.

Gallery

References

See also
List of castles in North Macedonia

Castles in North Macedonia
History of North Macedonia
First Bulgarian Empire
Former capitals of Bulgaria
Medieval Ohrid